Großschwabhausen is a municipality in the Weimarer Land district of Thuringia, Germany. On 1 December 2007, the former municipality Hohlstedt was incorporated by Großschwabhausen.

References

Weimarer Land
Grand Duchy of Saxe-Weimar-Eisenach